Larisa Neiland and Natasha Zvereva were the defending champions, but lost in the final to Jana Novotná and Helena Suková 4–6, 5–7.

Draw

Finals

Top half

Section 1

Section 2

Bottom half

Section 3

Section 4
{{16TeamBracket-Compact-Tennis3
|RD1=First round
|RD2=Second round
|RD3=Third round
|RD4=Quarterfinals

| RD1-seed01=8
| RD1-team01=

References
 Main draw
1990 French Open – Women's draws and results at the International Tennis Federation

Women's Doubles
French Open - Women's Doubles
French Open by year – Women's doubles
1990 in women's tennis
1990 in French women's sport